Ana Peleteiro Brión (born 2 December 1995 in Ribeira, Galicia, Spain) is a Spanish triple jumper and the current national record holder. She won the gold medal in the 2019 European Athletics Indoor Championships. She had previously won bronze medals at the 2018 World Indoor Championships and 2018 European Championships. At the 2020 Summer Olympics, she won the bronze medal with a national record of 14.87 m.

She received the award for Best Young Athlete from the Royal Spanish Athletics Federation in 2011.

Personal life
Peleteiro was born in Spain to a black African father and Galician mother, and adopted by a Spanish family as an only child. She is engaged to the French triple jumper Benjamin Compaoré, and had a daughter with him in December 2022.

International competitions

References

External links
 Ana Peleteiro at RFEA
 
 
 
 

1995 births
Living people
People from O Barbanza
Sportspeople from the Province of A Coruña
Spanish female triple jumpers
Spanish female long jumpers
Spanish adoptees
Spanish Athletics Championships winners
Castelao Medal recipients
European Athletics Indoor Championships winners
Athletes (track and field) at the 2020 Summer Olympics
Medalists at the 2020 Summer Olympics
Olympic bronze medalists for Spain
Olympic bronze medalists in athletics (track and field)
Olympic athletes of Spain
Spanish people of African descent